Libor Dvořák (born 13 June 1957) is a Czechoslovak sprint canoer who competed in the early 1980s. At the 1980 Summer Olympics in Moscow, he finished fourth in the C-1 1000 m event. He is son of Bedřich Dvořák and father of Filip Dvořák.

References
Sports-Reference.com profile

1957 births
Canoeists at the 1980 Summer Olympics
Czechoslovak male canoeists
Living people
Olympic canoeists of Czechoslovakia